Madrisquí (also known as Cayo Madriskí or Madrizqui) is a small island that belongs to the Archipelago of Los Roques, which is administratively part of the Federal Dependencies and is under the authority of the Miranda Island Territory in the waters of the Caribbean Sea of Venezuela . Is part of the tourist or recreational area of the park, is linked to Cayo Pirata through a narrow sand barrier. It has an area of 18.85 hectares (0.18 square kilometers).

Location
It is located to the southeast of Isla Gran Roque, to the northeast of Cayo Pirata, to the north of Isla Esparquí and the Ensenada or Bajo de los Corales and to the west of the so-called "Great Barrier Reef of the East".

Tourism
It is one of the keys most visited by tourists, due to its proximity to the island Gran Roque, has some inns to cater to visitors, beautiful beaches and a very practiced activity is diving. It is also very visited by fly fishing enthusiasts. On foot you can reach Cayo Pirata famous for its lobster fishing.

Gallery

See also
Cayo de Agua
Gran Roque

References

External links
Location map

Los Roques Archipelago